The Division 2 Féminine (D2F) is a handball league, and the second level of the French women's handball pyramid. It is organized by the Ligue Féminine de Handball (LFH), under delegation from the French Handball Federation (FFHB). 

Founded in 1971, it is currently contested by 14 teams. The league has both professional and amateur players.

History 
Founded in 1971, it was directly administered by the FFHB until the end of the 2021/2022 season when the D2F was absorbed by the LFH – the LFH was already managing the elite women's league (Division 1).

Participating teams

2022-23 season teams

Personnel and kits

Competition format 
All 14 teams play each other twice during the regular season (home and away matches). At the end of the regular season, the best placed team that possesses the  status is promoted to the top-tier level Division 1 Féminine (Ligue Butagaz Energie), and is replaced by the relegated bottom team from D1F.

The bottom three placed teams from each season of the D2F are relegated to the third tier level of handball, Nationale 1 Féminine (N1F). 3 qualified teams from N1F take their places. 

Teams receive three points for a win, two points for a draw and one point for a loss.

VAP status 
Clubs who want to access to the D1F in the relatively short term have to apply for and earn the VAP status (statut VAP).

The VAP status (Voie d'accession au professionnalisme, accession path to professionalism) is given annually to Division 2 clubs which have made the necessary steps (financial and administrative) to facilitate their professionalization and promotion to the top league. 

They have to fulfil set specifications, including:

 4 full-time professional players within the team, 3 full-time equivalent players
 1 full-time professional coach with the required diplomas
 1 or several administrative personnel (1 full-time equivalent (FTE) minimum)
 1 reserve team (who are able to play at a Nationale 1 Féminine level maximum, not in D2F) or a U17 team playing in a french league
 provisional budget of 600,000€ (excluding the valuation of voluntary work, and handball court-related arrangements/equipment that were placed gracefully at the disposal of the club)
 positive capital stock (except in the case of a debt clearance plan approved by the LFH finance control body)
 a court that fulfills set minimal standards
 presence of a doctor and a kinesitherapist at home games, a kinesitherapist (or a doctor) at away games
 access to high-speed Internet in the arena / gymnasium / sport facility

Clubs aren't obligated to have the VAP status to play in the D2F but they can't be promoted to the upper echelon without it. Those VAP status measures are in place since the 2012/2013 season and aim to prepare the clubs and support their viability in the professional sport world.

List of winners

See also 

 Coupe de France
 LFH Division 1 Féminine (Ligue Butagaz Énergie), the upper echelon of French women's handball
 LNH Division 1 (Liqui Moly Starligue), men's elite league
 LNH Division 2 (ProLigue), the corresponding men's competition
 List of handball clubs in France
 Women's sports

Notes and references 

France
women
Women's handball in France
Women's sports leagues in France